The 2014 Prairie View A&M Panthers football team represented Prairie View A&M University in the 2014 NCAA Division I FCS football season. The Panthers were led by fourth year head coach Heishma Northern and played their home games at Edward L. Blackshear Field. They were a member of the West Division of the Southwestern Athletic Conference (SWAC). They finished the season 5–5, 5–4 in SWAC play to finish in third place in the West Division.

On November 17, head coach Heishma Northern was fired. He finished at Prairie View A&M with a four year record of 19–25.

Schedule

References

Prairie View AandM
Prairie View A&M Panthers football seasons
Prairie View AandM Panthers football